Union County is a county in the northern part of the U.S. state of New Jersey. As of the 2020 United States census, the county was state's seventh-most-populous county with a population of 575,345, its highest decennial count ever and an increase of 38,846 (+7.2%) from the 2010 census count of 536,499. Its county seat is Elizabeth, which is also the most populous municipality in the county, with a 2020 census population of 137,298, and the largest by area, covering . The county is located in the North Jersey region.

In 2015, the county had a per capita personal income of $60,089, the seventh-highest in New Jersey and ranked 152nd of 3,113 counties in the United States.  The Bureau of Economic Analysis ranked the county as having the 119th-highest per capita income of all 3,113 counties in the United States (and the eighth-highest in New Jersey) in 2009. A study by Forbes.com determined that Union County pays the second-highest property taxes of all U.S. counties, based on 2007 data.

History

Etymology
Established in 1857 as the last county created in New Jersey, it was named after the Union threatened by slavery dispute during this period, which would erupt into civil war in 1861.

History
All of present-day Union County was part of the Elizabethtown Tract, which was purchased in 1664, by English colonists from the Lenape Native Americans that lived in the area of present-day Elizabeth, New Jersey. Union County was formed on March 19, 1857, from portions of Essex County; it was the last of New Jersey's 21 counties to be established.

Many historic places and structures are to be found in the county, including on the National Register of Historic Places listings in Union County, New Jersey.

Every fall, Union County holds its annual "Four Centuries in a Weekend" festival for the public, celebrating and touring historic buildings, museums and sites in the county.

Geography

Much of Union County is relatively flat and low-lying. Only in the northwestern corner does any significant relief appear as the Watchung Mountains cross the county. The lowest elevation is sea level along the eastern shore at the Arthur Kill.

Rivers, lakes and streams
Arthur Kill
Rahway River
Elizabeth River
Nomahegan Brook
Marshes Creek
Morses Creek
Peach Orchard Brook
Robinson's Brook
Robinson's Branch Reservoir

Climate and weather

In Berkeley Heights average monthly temperatures range from 29.4 °F in January to 74.7 °F in July. The climate in the county is hot-summer humid continental (Dfa) except east of approximately the New Jersey Turnpike where a humid subtropical climate (Cfa) exists.

Demographics

Union County is diverse ethnically. Berkeley Heights, Clark, Roselle Park, Cranford, Kenilworth, Linden, New Providence, Scotch Plains, Springfield, Summit, Union and Westfield have high percentages of Italian American residents. Elizabeth, Plainfield, Rahway, Roselle and Union all have large African American communities. Roselle Park has a notably large Indian American community, while Roselle Park, Roselle, Linden, Rahway, Plainfield and particularly Elizabeth have fast-growing Hispanic and Portuguese populations.

The county's Jewish population was 35,000 as of 2004, with notable communities located in Cranford, Elizabeth, Hillside, Linden, Scotch Plains, Springfield, Union, and Westfield.

2020 Census 

Note: the US Census treats Hispanic/Latino as an ethnic category. This table excludes Latinos from the racial categories and assigns them to a separate category. Hispanics/Latinos can be of any race.

2010 Census

Government

County Government

Union County is governed by a nine-member Board of County Commissioners. The members are elected at-large in partisan elections to serve three-year terms on a staggered basis, with three seats coming up for election each year. The Board sets policies for the operation of the county. The Commissioners perform the county's legislative and executive functions. In their legislative role, they formulate and adopt a budget and set county policies and procedures. In their executive role, they oversee county spending and functioning. Many of the administrative duties are delegated by the Board of County Commissioners to the County Manager. Each of the commissioners serves on various committees and boards as a part of their duties. These include committees on Economic Development, Parks and Recreation, and Public Works and Policy. In addition, the Board oversees the county's Open Space Trust Fund. Day-to-day operation of the county and its departments is supervised by an appointed County Manager, Edward Oatman. In 2016, freeholders were paid $30,692, while the Freeholder vice chairman received $31,732 and the Freeholder chairman had an annual salary of $32,773. The County Manager is Edward Oatman.

Union County is governed by a Board of County Commissioners, whose nine members are elected at-large to three-year terms of office on a staggered basis with three seats coming up for election each year, with an appointed County Manager overseeing the day-to-day operations of the county. At an annual reorganization meeting held in the beginning of January, the board selects a Chair and Vice Chair from among its members. , Union County's County Commissioners are (with terms for Chair and Vice-Chair ending every December 31st):

Constitutional officers elected on a countywide basis are:

Union County constitutes Vicinage 12 of the New Jersey Superior Court and is seated at the Union County Courthouse in Elizabeth, with additional facilities also located in Elizabeth; the Assignment Judge for Vicinage 12 is Karen M. Cassidy. Law enforcement at the county level includes the Union County Police Department, the Union County Sheriff's Office, and the Union County Prosecutor's Office. Union County's Acting Prosecutor is Michael A. Monahan.

Union County has the only county seal in the nation that depicts a woman being shot, the murder of Elizabethtown's Hannah Caldwell by British soldiers during the American Revolutionary War.

In 2022, controversy erupted over the county's deletion of negative social media comments made about the opening of Tëmike Park, an LGBTQ-inclusive playground, in Cedar Brook Park.

In 2022, a state court found the county illegally circumvented the public bidding process in awarding contracts for the construction of a proposed Union County government building in Elizabeth.

In 2022, county manager Ed Oatman and county director of finance Bibi Taylor sued an ex-county official and his wife for defamation.

In 2015, the county was forced to pay legal fees after losing a trademark claim it brought against a frequent county government critic who used the County of Union seal on her blog.

In 2009, following a First Amendment challenge by the American Civil Liberties Union, the county commissioners agreed to issue a public apology for cutting off speech by a resident who was addressing the board about possible nepotism on the county payroll.

Federal representatives 
Four Congressional Districts cover the county, including portions of the 7th, 8th, 10th and 12th Districts.

State representatives 
The 21 municipalities of Union County are represented by three separate legislative districts.

Sheriff's Office
The Union County Sheriff's Office is located in Elizabeth, New Jersey.

It is currently headed by Peter Corvelli.

It was headed by Ralph Froehlich, a Union resident who was first elected in 1977 and served in office for 37 years, making him the longest-serving Sheriff in New Jersey history. There are two top deputies, known as undersheriffs, and they are Dennis Burke and Amilcar Colon. A 1981 investigation of the Union County Jail reviewed issues relating to overcrowding, escapes, escape attempts and suicides in the detention facility.

On July 1, 2021, the Sheriff's Office regained control of the Union County Jail and made it a division within the organization; the Division of Corrections. 

The New Jersey State Policemen's Benevolent Association Local 108 is the official labor union and the collective bargaining agent for the Sheriff's Officers of Union County. This body is subdivided into Local 108 for the line officers and Local 108A for the supervisors (sergeants, lieutenants, & captains).

Union County Police
Union County is the only county with a county police department. The Union County Police Department operates independently of the Sheriff's office. The Union County Police Department originally began as the Union County Park Police. The Union County Police are tasked with patrolling Union County's properties. They also supplement the local municipalities with police presence and patrol when requested. Captain James Debbie is the current Officer in Charge.

The Union County Police have several divisions and are relied upon for their multiple services. Currently assigned are Patrol, Detective Bureau, Emergency Services Unit, and the Marine Unit.  Union County Regional 911 and Dispatch is one of the many services that the County Police provide.  They are the primary PSAP for multiple municipalities, provide police/fire/EMS dispatch, dispatch medics, and Union County Fire Mutual Aid. The PD belongs to the New Jersey State Policemen's Benevolent Association, Local 73.

Politics 
As of October 1, 2021, there were a total of 362,501 registered voters in Union County, of whom 178,449 (49.2%) were registered as Democrats, 57,878 (16.0%) were registered as Republicans and 121,478 (33.5%) were registered as unaffiliated. There were 4,696 voters (1.3%) registered to other parties. Among the county's 2010 Census population, 53.3% were registered to vote, including 70.6% of those ages 18 and over.

In the 2008 presidential election, Democrat Barack Obama received 141,417 votes here (63.1%), ahead of Republican John McCain with 78,768 votes (35.2%) and other candidates with 1,912 votes (0.9%), among the 223,951 ballots cast by the county's 299,762 registered voters, for a turnout of 74.7%. In the 2012 presidential election, Democrat Barack Obama received 139,752 votes here (66.0%), ahead of Republican Mitt Romney with 68,314 votes (32.3%) and other candidates with 1,765 votes (0.8%), among the 211,597 ballots cast by the county's 307,628 registered voters, for a turnout of 68.8%. In the 2016 election, Democrat Hillary Clinton won by a slightly wider margin than Barack Obama in 2012, even as the nation shifted to the right. In the 2020 election, Democrat Joe Biden received the highest share of the vote for a Democrat in the county's history.

|}

In the 2009 gubernatorial election, Democrat Jon Corzine received 68,867 ballots cast (50.6%), ahead of Republican Chris Christie with 56,769 votes (41.7%), Independent Chris Daggett with 7,999 votes (5.9%) and other candidates with 1,058 votes (0.8%), among the 136,110 ballots cast by the county's 292,490 registered voters, yielding a 46.5% turnout. In the 2013 gubernatorial election, Republican Governor Chris Christie narrowly won the county 51.2% (58,135 votes) to 47.4% (53,869 votes) over Democrat Barbara Buono, marking the only time the county voted Republican in the 21st century. In the 2017 gubernatorial election, Republican Kim Guadagno received 32.6% of the vote (39,552 ballots cast) to Democrat Phil Murphy with 65.2% (79,113 votes). In the 2021 gubernatorial election, Republican Jack Ciattarelli received 37.6% of the vote (51,279 ballots cast) to Democrat Phil Murphy's 61.6% (83,913 votes).

Education

Tertiary education
Kean University, a co-educational, public research university dating back to 1855 is located in Union and Hillside, serving nearly 13,000 undergraduates. Kean University educates its students in the liberal arts, the sciences and the professions; it is best known for its programs in the humanities and social sciences and in education, graduating the most teachers in the state of New Jersey annually, along with a physical therapy program which it holds in conjunction with the University of Medicine and Dentistry of New Jersey.

Union College is the two-year community college for Union County, one of a network of 19 county colleges in New Jersey. Union College was founded in 1933 as Union County College and has campuses in Cranford, Elizabeth, Plainfield and Scotch Plains.

School districts
Most municipalities have their own public high schools, exceptions being Garwood, whose students attend Arthur L. Johnson High School in Clark; Winfield, whose students attend David Brearley High School in Kenilworth; and Mountainside, whose students attend Governor Livingston High School in Berkeley Heights. Fanwood is mostly merged with Scotch Plains educationally and the two towns have one high school.

The county has the following school districts:
K-12

Berkeley Heights Public Schools
Clark Public School District
Cranford Township Public Schools
Elizabeth Public Schools
Hillside Public Schools
Kenilworth Public Schools
Linden Public Schools
New Providence School District
Plainfield Public School District
Rahway Public Schools
Roselle Public Schools
Roselle Park School District
Scotch Plains-Fanwood Regional School District
Springfield Public Schools
Summit Public Schools
Union Public School District
Westfield Public Schools

Elementary (K-8)
Garwood Public Schools
Mountainside School District
Winfield Township School District

The county also has Union County Vocational Technical Schools, which has both full-time magnet programs that students must apply to, and split-time vocational programs.

Economy
The top employers in 2011, according to the Union County Economic Development Corporation, were:

Transportation
The county is served by rail, air, highways and ports.

Roads and highways

Major highways which traverse the county include the New Jersey Turnpike (I-95), the Garden State Parkway, I-78, I-278, Route 1/9, Route 22, Route 24. Route 27, Route 28, Route 35 (only in Rahway), Route 82, Route 124, Route 439, and the Goethals Bridge. At 0.15 miles, Route 59, located entirely in Union County, is the shortest state highway in New Jersey.

Public transportation
Passenger rail service is provide by NJ Transit via the Northeast Corridor, North Jersey Coast Line, Raritan Valley Line, the Morristown Line and the Gladstone Branch. Freight service is provided by on Conrail's Lehigh Line and Chemical Coast Branch. Freight and passenger rail service was provided by the Rahway Valley Railroad from 1897 until 1992 when the short line closed due to lack of customers.

NJ Transit provides bus service to the Port Authority Bus Terminal in Midtown Manhattan, as well as service to major cities in New Jersey and within Union County.

The Port Newark-Elizabeth Marine Terminal is part of the Port Authority of New York and New Jersey.

The southern portion of Newark Liberty International Airport is located in Elizabeth, within Union County.

Potential rail-to-trails
Union County Park Line rail trail is a proposed walking and/or biking trail proposed on old railroad tracks. Two abandoned rails exist in the county.

The City of Summit and the Summit Park Line Foundation are working on turning the line from Morris Avenue to Briant Park in Summit into a rail trail that will be approximately one mile long. This rail trail, potentially called the Summit Park Line, could provide a greenway to connect several county parks, akin to a Summit High Line. A path could run directly from Summit to the Arthur Kill in Linden, New Jersey on the Rahway Valley Railroad and the Staten Island Rapid Transit line.

The Summit city council applied for a $1 million grant toward the Summit Park Line project in November 2016.  "If Summit is able to complete the project, it might help other parts of the greenway come through," said Union County Public Relations Coordinator, Sebastian Delia.

The Rahway Valley Railroad runs from Summit to Roselle Park. Beginning in Hidden Valley Park, the railroad right-of-way continues by connecting Houdaille Quarry, Briant Park, Meisel Park, Rahway River Parkway, Galloping Hill Golf Course and Black Brook Park. The ending of the railway is on Westfield Avenue in Roselle Park. The Staten Island Rapid Transit runs from Cranford to Staten Island, although the project would only include the section that runs from Cranford to Linden. The possible inception in Cranford would be a lot on South Avenue East. The ending of this trail would be in Linden at an empty lot. A boardwalk would run over the existing tracks to ease line reactivation.

Municipalities

The 21 municipalities in Union County (with 2010 Census data for population, housing units and area) are:

Parks and recreation

County parks are maintained and operated by the Union County Department of Parks and Recreation, the successor agency to the Union County Park Commission.

County-run parks

Ash Brook Reservation, Scotch Plains
Black Brook Park, Kenilworth
Briant Park, Summit
Brookside Park, Scotch Plains

Cedar Brook Park, Plainfield
Home to the Shakespeare Garden.
Echo Lake Park, Westfield and Mountainside
The privately owned Echo Lake Country Club donated the parkland for this park in the 1920s. The name arises from the echo heard off the high bluff on the far side of the lake. Echo Lake itself was created by damning when mills were established on Nomahegan Brook, a tributary of the Rahway River. The Great Minisink Trail passed by Echo Lake Park.
Elizabeth River Parkway
Esposito Park, Clark
Features a 1/2-mile path with exercise equipment and a skate park
Green Brook Park, Plainfield (partial)
Hidden Valley Park, Springfield and Summit
Eastern border is adjacent to the now-closed Houdaille Quarry.
Houdaille Quarry, Springfield (closed to public)
Kawameeh Park, Union
Lenape Park, Cranford, Westfield, and Kenilworth
In the 1930s, workers digging Lenape Lake found mastodon bones here.
Madison Avenue Park, Rahway
Adjacent to Rahway 7th and 8th Grade Academy

Clark Reservoir Recreation Area
Mattano Park, Elizabeth
Named for a Lenape tribal leader, whose name was recorded by colonists as Mattano. In 1664, a group called the Elizabethtown Associates bought land in the Union County area from Mattano and another Lenape leader named Warinanco.
McConnell Park, Cranford
Named for the first town doctor in Cranford
Milton Lake Park, Clark and Rahway
Mindowaskin Park, Westfield
Nomahegan Park, Cranford
 Contains Nomahegan Park Pond and encircles the Rahway River.
Oak Ridge Park, Clark
Passaic River Parkway, Berkeley Heights, New Providence, and Summit
Phil Rizzuto Park, Elizabeth
Ponderosa Farm Park, Scotch Plains
Rahway River Park, Rahway
Environmental groups protested at the building of a stadium here in 2016. The movement gave birth to Friends of Rahway River Parkway.
Rahway River Parkway
Snyder Avenue Park, Berkeley Heights
Sperry Park, Cranford
Stanley Avenue Park, Summit
Tamaques Park, Scotch Plains
Unami Park, Cranford, Garwood, and Westfield
Washington Avenue Park, Springfield
Watchung Reservation, Mountainside and Scotch Plains
Warinanco Park, Elizabeth and Roselle
Named for the Native American known as "Warinanco."  Designed by the Olmsted Brothers firm.
Wheeler Park, Linden

Other notable parks
Parks that are not managed by the county government include:
Hawk Rise Sanctuary.  A bird sanctuary was built in 2012 on the banks of Rahway River in Linden. Hawk Rise Sanctuary is a 95-acre ecological preserve and wetland complex in Linden in an area previously concealed by various industrial land uses. Its trails were created adjacent to the former Linden Landfill area by the New Jersey Department of Environmental Protection, the city of Linden and the New Jersey Audubon Society.  The trails in the Hawk Rise forest are boardwalk, with some continuing as gravel along the edge of the former Linden Landfill. It has an overlook area where hikers can view the Rahway River and nearby marshes. It has been open to the public since 2012. The site includes diverse environments: forested wetlands, vernal pools, grasslands, shrublands, salt marsh, mudflats, a pond, and the tidal Rahway River. 163 bird species have been spotted there.  It has been reported as vandalized. 
Reeves-Reed Arboretum in Summit.
Kennedy Reservation in Union.
The grounds of Liberty Hall Museum near the campus of Kean University in Union and Elizabeth.

Rahway River Parkway
The Rahway River Parkway is a greenway of parkland that hugs the Rahway River and its tributaries, such as Nomahegan Brook.  It was the inaugural project of the Union County Parks Commission designed in the 1920s by the Olmsted Brothers firm, who were the sons of landscape architect Frederick Law Olmsted. Several county and municipal parks run along the Rahway River.

Elizabeth River Parkway
The Elizabeth River Parkway is a greenway of parkland alongside the Elizabeth River and its tributaries. It runs through Kean University and Liberty Hall Museum on the river's way to the Arthur Kill. The Elizabeth River Parkway is broken down into separate sections.

Chatfield/Zimmerman - Hillside and Union Township
Lightning Brook - Hillside and Union
Pruden/Pearl Oval - Elizabeth
Salem/Rutgers/Liberty - Hillside and Union
Woodruff/Conant Street - Hillside and Union
Ursino - Hillside and Union Township

Public golf courses
Union County's Division of Golf Operations runs two golf courses, which offer golf lessons and practice areas.
Ash Brook Golf Course in Scotch Plains.
Galloping Hill Golf Course and Golf Learning Center in Kenilworth. The facility, which hosts the headquarters of the New Jersey State Golf Association, hosted the 2016 New Jersey State Open golf tournament, the first public golf course to host the tournament since it was established in 1921.

Another notable course

Shady Rest Country Club  in Scotch Plains is recognized as the first African-American owned and operated golf clubhouse in the United States.  As such, Shady Rest is the home course of the first African-American golf professional to play in the U.S. Open, John Matthew Shippen, Jr. (1879-1968), who is considered a pioneer of the sport.   Originally a private club and center for African-American social life, the township acquired and renamed it in the 1930s as the 'Scotch Hills Country Club' and made it open to the public. Unfortunately, the history and significance of the course and clubhouse has not always been promoted as a place of national historic interest.  Thankfully, the National Park Service has listed the Shady Rest Golf and Country Club (_100007869) in the National Registry of Historic Places, in large part due to the efforts of the Preserve Shady Rest Committee.   The committee continues working to further solidify Shady Rest as a local, state, and national landmark given its historical significance.

Private golf courses
Baltusrol Golf Club is a private 36-hole golf club in Springfield founded in 1895 by Louis Keller. Both courses were originally designed by A. W. Tillinghast in 1918. The club has hosted seven U.S. Opens and the 2005 and 2016 PGA Championships.
Echo Lake Country Club is a private, member-owned country club located in Westfield, founded in 1899. The 18-hole golf course was designed by Donald Ross in 1913.
Hyatt Hills Golf Complex in Clark.
Shackamaxon Country Club
Suburban Golf Club

Other recreational facilities
Clark Community Pool
Centennial Avenue Pool in Cranford, NJ
Oak Ridge Archery Range
Orange Avenue Pool in Cranford, NJ
Trailside Nature and Science Center at Watchung Reservation
Warinanco Ice Skating Rink

Wheeler Park
Westfield Memorial Pool
Spray Pool – Wheeler Park (Linden)
County Pool – Rahway River Park (Rahway)

Arts and culture
The Union County Performing Arts Center, located in the Rahway Arts District, offers professional productions in music and theater as well as training in the performing arts.
Kean Stage is the professional performing arts arm of Kean University. It is home to Wilkins Theatre on the Kean Main Campus in Union, Enlow Recital Hall directly across the Elizabeth River in East Campus in Hillside, as well as Premiere Stages, the professional equity theater company in residence at Kean University.
The Cranford Dramatic Club is New Jersey's oldest continually producing theater and has been putting on theatrical productions since its establishment in 1919.
Tomasulo Art Gallery is in the MacKay Library at Union County College's Cranford campus.
The Wharton Institute for the Performing Arts, located in Berkeley Heights and New Providence, is a center for music training and other training in performing arts, particularly aimed at children.  It consists of the Performing Arts School (formerly Wharton Music Center), New Jersey Youth Symphony, and Paterson Music Project.
The Plainfield Symphony Orchestra was founded in 1919, making it the state's oldest community orchestra.
The duCret School of Art in Plainfield was founded in 1926.
The Swain Gallery, in Plainfield, was founded in 1868 and is the oldest privately owned art gallery in the state.

Union County Historical Society
In 1869, the Union County Historical Society of New Jersey was incorporated.  The society meets at the Hanson House in Cranford.

Municipal historical societies
Berkeley Heights - The Berkeley Heights Historical Society.
Clark - The Clark Historical Society was founded in 1970.  It operates the Dr. William Robinson Plantation House Museum, built in 1690 by a doctor from Scotland.
Cranford - The Cranford Historic Preservation Advisory Board is an official township committee body, while the Cranford Historical Society itself is citizen-run.  It is located in the Hanson House in Hanson Park on Springfield Avenue and maintains the Crane-Phillips House a couple of blocks south on North Union Avenue as a museum.
Garwood -  Garwood Historical Committee.
Hillside - The Hillside Historical Society, founded in 1975, meets at the Woodruff House.
Kenilworth -  The Kenilworth Historical Society dates to 1974. It runs the Oswald J. Nitschke House.
Linden - The Linden Society for Historical Preservation is an offshoot of an official cultural board in the city.
Mountainside - The Mountainside Restoration Committee, Inc. is also called the Mountainside Historic Committee, founded in 1984.
Plainfield - The Historical Society of Plainfield is headquartered at the Nathaniel Drake House Museum, built in 1746 on the Old York Road.
Rahway - The Rahway Historical Society is now called the Merchants' and Drovers' Tavern Museum Association.
Scotch Plains and Fanwood - The Scotch Plains-Fanwood Historical Society runs the Osborn Cannonball House.
Springfield - The Historic Cannon Ball House serves as the home of the Springfield Historical Society.
Westfield - The Westfield Historical Society is in the Reeve History & Cultural Resource Center, a structure from the 1870s. The Society also runs the Miller-Cory House Museum, in a home that dates back to the 1740s.
Union -  Union Township Historical Society is located in the 1782 historic Caldwell Parsonage. The Society's mission is to preserve and promote the rich and diverse history of the Township of Union.

Other historical preservation groups
Friends of Rahway River Parkway is dedicated to preserving Olmsted design principles and features of county parkland along the Rahway River as it flows to the Arthur Kill.

Sister city
The county has a sister city relationship with Wenzhou in Zhejiang, China.

See also

National Register of Historic Places listings in Union County, New Jersey

References

External links

 Changing Landscape of Union County
 Official website of Union County

 
1857 establishments in New Jersey
Counties in the New York metropolitan area
Populated places established in 1857